The Estonian Athletics Championships is an annual track and field competition which serves as the national championship for Estonia. It is organised by the Estonian Athletic Association, Estonia's national governing body for the sport of athletics. The winner of each event at the championships is declared the national champion for that year. The competition was first held in 1917 and was held as a sub-national competition during the time that the Soviet Athletics Championships existed, before becoming the top level national competition for Estonians upon independence in 1991.

Men

100 metres

1917*: Johannes Villemson
1918*: Johannes Villemson
1919*: Johannes Villemson
1920: Reinhold Saulmann
1921: Konstantin Pereversin
1922: Konstantin Pereversin
1923: Reinhold Kesküll
1924: Konstantin Pereversin
1925: Reinhold Kesküll
1926: Elmar Rähn
1927: Edgar Labent
1928: Edgar Labent
1929: Edgar Labent
1930: Valter Korol
1931: Valter Rattus
1932: Nikolai Küttis
1933: Rudolf Tomson
1934: Rudolf Tomson
1935: Ruudi Toomsalu
1936: Ruudi Toomsalu
1937: Ruudi Toomsalu
1938: Ruudi Toomsalu
1939: Georg Vuht
1940: Harry Aumere
1941: –
1942: Konstantin Ivanov
1943: Vadim Palm
1944: Heino Koik
1945: Konstantin Ivanov
1946: Heldur Tüüts
1947: Georg Gilde
1948: Georg Gilde
1949: Endel Küllik
1950: Georg Gilde
1951: Uno Liiv
1952: Georg Gilde
1953: Uno Liiv
1954: Heino Heinlo
1955: Uno Kiiroja
1956: Uno Kiiroja
1957: Heino Heinlo
1958: Toomas Kitsing
1959: Uno Kiiroja
1960: Uno Kiiroja
1961: Eino Ojastu
1962: Toomas Kitsing
1963: Toomas Kitsing
1964: Jüri Liigand
1965: Jüri Liigand
1966: Jüri Liigand
1967: Boris Nugis and Eduard Püve
1968: Jüri Liigand
1969: Viktor Kirilenko
1970: Avo Oja
1971: Kalju Jurkatamm
1972: Jüri Liigand
1973: Paul Nagel
1974: Andres Luka
1975: Gennadi Organov
1976: Gennadi Organov
1977: Gennadi Organov
1978: Gennadi Organov
1979: Jevgeni Jessin
1980: Jevgeni Jessin
1981: Mihhail Urjadnikov
1982: Mihhail Urjadnikov
1983: Mihhail Urjadnikov
1984: Mihhail Urjadnikov
1985: Andrus Möll
1986: Andrus Möll
1987: Andrus Möll
1988: Enn Lilienthal
1989: Enn Lilienthal
1990: Andrei Morozov
1991: Andrei Morozov
1992: Andrei Morozov
1993: Andrei Morozov
1994: Andrei Morozov
1995: Andrei Morozov
1996: Rainis Jaansoo
1997: Rainis Jaansoo
1998: Tanel Soosaar
1999: Erki Nool
2000: Maidu Laht
2001: Garol Pärn
2002: Argo Golberg
2003: Argo Golberg
2004: Allar Aasma
2005: Henri Sool
2006: Marek Niit
2007: Henri Sool
2008: Marek Niit
2009: Richard Pulst
2010: Richard Pulst
2011: Mart Muru
2012: Marek Niit
2013: Timo Tiismaa
2014: Rait Veesalu
2015: Kaspar Mesila
2016: Timo Tiismaa
2017: Marek Niit
2018: Richard Pulst
2019: Karl Erik Nazarov
2020: Henri Sai
2021: Karl Erik Nazarov
2022: Karl Erik Nazarov

200 metres

1918*: Johannes Villemson
1919*: Johannes Villemson
1920: Reinhold Saulmann
1921: Konstantin Pereversin
1922: Konstantin Pereversin
1923: Konstantin Pereversin
1924: Konstantin Pereversin
1925: Reinhold Kesküll
1926: Elmar Rähn
1927: Julius Tiisfeldt
1928: Edgar Labent
1929: Edgar Labent
1930: Valter Korol
1931: Valter Rattus
1932: Nikolai Küttis
1933: Rudolf Tomson
1934: Rudolf Tomson
1935: Ruudi Toomsalu
1936: Ruudi Toomsalu
1937: Ruudi Toomsalu
1938: Valter Kalam
1939: Valter Kalam
1940: Eduard Nurk
1941: –
1942: Konstantin Ivanov
1943: Konstantin Ivanov
1944: Heino Koik
1945: Aleksander Sirel
1946: Georg Gilde
1947: Georg Gilde
1948: Georg Gilde
1949: Endel Küllik
1950: Georg Gilde
1951: Georg Gilde
1952: Georg Gilde
1953: Ülo Laaspere
1954: Heino Heinlo
1955: Ursel Teedemaa
1956: Ülo Laaspere
1957: Heino Heinlo
1958: Toomas Kitsing
1959: Uno Kiiroja
1960: Eino Ojastu
1961: Kalju Jurkatamm
1962: Enno Akkel
1963: Toomas Kitsing
1964: Kalju Jurkatamm
1965: Kalju Kikamägi
1966: Kalju Jurkatamm
1967: Boris Nugis
1968: Kalju Kikamägi
1969: Viktor Kirilenko
1970: Avo Oja
1971: Ennu Laasner
1972: Rein Tõru
1973: Andres Luka
1974: Vladimir Ivaštšenko
1975: Gennadi Organov
1976: Ramon Lindal
1977: Jevgeni Jessin
1978: Gennadi Organov
1979: Gennadi Organov
1980: Ramon Lindal
1981: Mihhail Urjadnikov
1982: Ramon Lindal
1983: Mihhail Urjadnikov
1984: Mihhail Urjadnikov
1985: Andrus Möll
1986: Andrus Möll
1987: Andrus Möll
1988: Enn Lilienthal
1989: Enn Lilienthal
1990: Enn Lilienthal
1991: Andrei Morozov
1992: Rainis Jaansoo
1993: Andrei Morozov
1994: Andrus Hämelane
1995: Andrus Hämelane
1996: Rainis Jaansoo
1997: Rainis Jaansoo
1998: Urmet Uusorg
1999: Mait Lind
2000: Maidu Laht
2001: Martin Vihmann
2002: Martin Vihmann
2003: Henri Sool
2004: Martin Vihmann
2005: Martin Vihmann
2006: Marek Niit
2007: Taavi Liiv
2008: Henri Sool
2009: Marek Niit
2010: Richard Pulst
2011: Marek Niit
2012: Marek Niit
2013: Marek Niit
2014: Marek Niit
2015: Markus Ellisaar
2016: Timo Tiismaa
2017: Marek Niit
2018: Tony Nõu
2019: Ken-Mark Minkovski
2020: Henri Sai
2021: Henri Sai
2022: Karl Erik Nazarov

400 metres
1991: Aivar Ojastu
1992: Aivar Ojastu
1993: Rainis Jaansoo
1994: Rainis Jaansoo
1995: Rainis Jaansoo
1996: Urmet Uusorg
1997: Urmet Uusorg
1998: Urmet Uusorg
1999: Urmet Uusorg
2000: Urmet Uusorg
2001: Urmet Uusorg
2002: Urmet Uusorg
2003: Lauri Birkan
2004: Martin Vihmann
2005: Martin Vihmann
2006: Henri Sool

800 metres
1991: Raivo Raspel
1992: Raivo Raspel
1993: Raivo Raspel
1994: Oleg Holdai
1995: Marko Metsala
1996: Urmet Uusorg
1997: Urmet Uusorg
1998: Oleg Holdai
1999: Urmet Uusorg
2000: Igor Holdai
2001: Urmet Uusorg
2002: Urmet Uusorg
2003: Sergo Treufeld
2004: Roman Fosti
2005: Priit Lehismets
2006: Priit Põldmaa

1500 metres
1991: Andry Prodel
1992: Veljo Lamp
1993: Arvi Uba
1994: Indrek Mänd
1995: Marko Metsala
1996: Heiki Sarapuu
1997: Oleg Holdai
1998: Marko Metsala
1999: Oleg Holdai
2000: Margus Pirksaar
2001: Rainis Mitt
2002: Roman Fosti
2003: Rainis Mitt
2004: Nikolai Vedehin
2005: Tiidrek Nurme
2006: Tiidrek Nurme

5000 metres

1917*: Heinrich Paal
1918*: Jüri Lossman
1919*: Jüri Lossman
1920: Jüri Lossman
1921: Hugo Osterode
1922: Aleksander Erlich
1923: Karl Laurson
1924: Julius Tiisfeldt
1925: Karl Laurson
1926: Karl Laurson
1927: Karl Laurson
1928: Felix Beldsinsky
1929: Felix Beldsinsky
1930: Martin Prost
1931: Felix Beldsinsky
1932: Eduard Prööm
1933: Eduard Prööm
1934: Eduard Prööm
1935: Eduard Prööm
1936: Eduard Prööm
1937: Eduard Prööm
1938: Eduard Prööm
1939: Eduard Prööm
1940: Eduard Prööm
1941: –
1942: Eduard Prööm
1943: Richard Lulla
1944: Ilmar Piliste
1945: Nikolai Aleksejev
1946: Nikolai Aleksejev
1947: Nikolai Aleksejev
1948: Ilmar Reidla
1949: Mihail Velsvebel
1950: Mihail Velsvebel
1951: Erich Veetõusme
1952: Vladimir Kuts
1953: Viktor Puusepp
1954: Hubert Pärnakivi
1955: Hubert Pärnakivi
1956: Lembit Virkus
1957: Tõnu Soom
1958: Tõnu Soom
1959: Lembit Virkus
1960: Lembit Virkus
1961: Hubert Pärnakivi
1962: Hubert Pärnakivi
1963: Ants Nurmekivi
1964: Mart Vilt
1965: Mart Vilt
1966: Maido Keskküla
1967: Erik Maasik
1968: Mart Vilt
1969: Ants Nurmekivi
1970: Aleksander Tšernov
1971: Ants Nurmekivi
1972: Erik Maasik
1973: Vladimir Raudsepp
1974: Enn Sellik
1975: Erik Maasik
1976: Vladimir Raudsepp
1977: Lev Zagžetskas
1978: Sergei Ustintsev
1979: Toomas Turb
1980: Toomas Turb
1981: Rein Valdmaa
1982: Rein Valdmaa
1983: Enn Sellik
1984: Toomas Turb
1985: Toomas Turb
1986: Ain Mõnjam
1987: Toomas Turb
1988: Rein Valdmaa
1989: Heiki Sarapuu
1990: Margus Kirt
1991: Vjatšeslav Košelev
1992: Arvi Uba
1993: Henno Haava
1994: Pavel Loskutov
1995: Pavel Loskutov
1996: Heiki Sarapuu
1997: Heiki Sarapuu
1998: Pavel Loskutov
1999: Toomas Tarm
2000: Margus Pirksaar
2001: Risto Ütsmüts
2002: Margus Pirksaar
2003: Pavel Loskutov
2004: Aleksei Saveljev
2005: Tiidrek Nurme
2006: Tiidrek Nurme
2007: Tiidrek Nurme
2008: Aleksei Markov
2009: Taivo Püi
2010: Sergei Tšerepannikov
2011: Tiidrek Nurme
2012: Allar Lamp
2013: Sergei Tšerepannikov
2014: Roman Fosti 
2015: Tiidrek Nurme
2016: Keio Kits
2017: Tiidrek Nurme
2018: Tiidrek Nurme
2019: Tiidrek Nurme
2020: Tiidrek Nurme
2021: Tiidrek Nurme
2022: Kaur Kivistik

10,000 metres
1991: Vjatšeslav Košelev
1992: Heiki Sarapuu
1993: Meelis Veilberg
1994: Toomas Tarm
1995: Rein Valdmaa
1996: Pavel Loskutov
1997: Meelis Veilberg
1998: Pavel Loskutov
1999: Pavel Loskutov
2000: Toomas Tarm
2001: Pavel Loskutov
2002: Toomas Tarm
2003: Margus Pirksaar
2004: Toomas Tarm
2005: Margus Pirksaar
2006: Margus Pirksaar

Half marathon
1993: Pavel Loskutov
1994: Heiki Sarapuu
1995: Margus Pirksaar
1996: Pavel Loskutov
1997: Margus Pirksaar
1998: Ahto Tatter
1999: Pavel Loskutov
2000: Pavel Loskutov
2001: Pavel Loskutov
2002: Pavel Loskutov
2003: Pavel Loskutov
2004: Pavel Loskutov
2005: Pavel Loskutov

Marathon

1927: Elmar Reiman
1928: Karl Laas
1929: Karl Laas
1930: Karl Laas
1931–1933: –
1934: Alfred Maasik
1935: Otto Treimann
1936: August Koidu
1937–1938: –
1939: Bernhard Lont
1940: Bernhard Lont
1941–1946: –
1947: Loit Laidna
1948: Aleksander Külm
1949: Richard Lulla
1950: Viktor Puusepp
1951: Nikolai Kanajev
1952: Arnold Vaabla
1953: Viktor Puusepp
1954: Viktor Puusepp
1955: Viktor Puusepp
1956: Viktor Puusepp
1957: Viktor Puusepp
1958: Arkaadi Birkenfeldt
1959: Rein Leinus
1960: Rein Leinus
1961: Rein Leinus
1962: Rein Leinus
1963: Rein Leinus
1964: Ronald Suur
1965: Ronald Suur
1966: Ronald Suur
1967: Rein Leinus
1968: Rein Leinus
1969: Rein Leinus
1970: Rein Leinus
1971: Mart Kalder
1972: Jüri Liim
1973: Mati Kartau
1974: Küllo Tiido
1975: Toivo Koovit
1976: Küllo Tiido
1977: Toivo Koovit
1978: Aare Kuum
1979: Avo Järv
1980: Aare Kuum
1981: Rene Meimer
1982: Vladimir Heerik
1983: Villy Sudemäe
1984: Villy Sudemäe
1985: Villy Sudemäe
1986: Kalev Urbanik
1987: Meelis Veilberg
1988: Rein Valdmaa
1989: Kaupo Sabre
1990: Kaupo Sabre
1991: Kaupo Sabre
1992: Vello Misler
1993: Rein Valdmaa
1994: Henno Haava
1995: Vladimir Arhipov
1996: Kaupo Sabre
1997: Margus Pirksaar
1998: Toomas Tarm
1999: Kaupo Sabre
2000: Vladimir Bõtšuk
2001: Kaupo Sabre
2002: Toomas Tarm
2003: Toomas Tarm
2004: Toomas Tarm
2005: Margus Lehtna
2006: Taavi Tambur
2007: Aleksei Saveljev
2008: Aleksei Markov
2009: Aleksei Markov
2010: Pavel Loskutov
2011: Kaupo Sasmin
2012: Viljar Vallimäe
2013: Roman Fosti
2014: Heinar Vaine
2015: Sergei Tšerepannikov
2016: Heinar Vaine
2017: Argo Jõesoo
2018: Roman Fosti
2019: Raido Mitt
2020: Rauno Jallai
2021: Dmitri Aristov

3000 metres steeplechase
1991: Veljo Lamp
1992: Veljo Lamp
1993: Pavel Loskutov
1994: Pavel Loskutov
1995: Pavel Loskutov
1996: Veljo Lamp
1997: Risto Puusepp
1998: Arli Mändmets
1999: Kaupo Tiislär
2000: Kaupo Tiislär
2001: Kaupo Tiislär
2002: Sergei Tšerepannikov
2003: Kaupo Tiislär
2004: Kaupo Tiislär
2005: Aleksei Saveljev
2006: Aleksei Saveljev

110 metres hurdles
1991: Indrek Kaseorg
1992: Hendrik Leetmäe
1993: Hendrik Leetmäe
1994: Indrek Kaseorg
1995: Hendrik Leetmäe
1996: Hendrik Leetmäe
1997: Hendrik Leetmäe
1998: Erki Nool
1999: Erki Nool
2000: Tarmo Jallai
2001: Rene Oruman
2002: Jüri Kafanov
2003: Tarmo Jallai
2004: Tarmo Jallai
2005: Tarmo Jallai
2006: Rene Oruman

400 metres hurdles
1991: Vladimir Šmarjov
1992: Marek Helinurm
1993: Marek Helinurm
1994: Indrek Kaseorg
1995: Tiit Mauer
1996: Tiit Mauer
1997: Indrek Kaseorg
1998: Indrek Tustit
1999: Indrek Tustit
2000: Kristjan Suur
2001: Andrei Oll
2002: Indrek Tustit
2003: Andrei Oll
2004: Indrek Tustit
2005: Indrek Tustit
2006: Indrek Tustit

High jump

1917*: Sergei Rutkovski
1918*: Artur Proos
1919*: Bernhard Abrams
1920: Aleksander Klumberg
1921: Aleksander Klumberg
1922: Aleksander Klumberg
1923: Aleksander Klumberg
1924: Aleksander Klumberg
1925: Paul Steinberg
1926: Evald Roht
1927: Aleksander Klumberg
1928: Evald Roht
1929: Evald Kink
1930: Gustav Sule
1931: Gert Schmidt
1932: Gert Schmidt
1933: Aksel Kuuse
1934: Gert Schmidt
1935: Aksel Kuuse
1936: Aksel Kuuse
1937: Aksel Kuuse
1938: Olev Kaldre
1939: Olev Kaldre
1940: Lembit Kiisa
1941: –
1942: Viktor Palango
1943: Viktor Palango
1944: Viktor Palango
1945: Ants Kalda
1946: Erich Pilliroog
1947: Erich Pilliroog
1948: Erich Pilliroog
1949: Ülo Raidma
1950: Heino Apart
1951: Heino Apart
1952: Heino Apart
1953: Uno Palu
1954: Juhan Unger
1955: Ivo Jürviste
1956: Juhan Unger
1957: Rein Ellermaa
1958: Rein Ellermaa
1959: Jaak Ilves
1960: Rein Ellermaa
1961: Rein Ellermaa
1962: Valdeko Ruven
1963: Igor Kurve
1964: Igor Kurve
1965: Jüri Tarmak
1966: Jüri Tarmak
1967: Jüri Tarmak
1968: Vello Lumi
1969: Toomas Berendsen
1970: Valeri Peterson
1971: Andres Külvand
1972: Vello Lumi
1973: Villu Mengel
1974: Heiki Kask
1975: Vello Lumi
1976: Vello Lumi
1977: Heiki Kask
1978: Tiit Pahapill
1979: Tiit Pahapill
1980: Tiit Pahapill
1981: Ain Evard
1982: Ain Evard
1983: Tarmo Valgepea
1984: Kalev Martsepp
1985: Ain Evard
1986: Ain Evard
1987: Ain Evard
1988: Ain Evard
1989: Ain Evard
1990: Ain Evard
1991: Ain Evard
1992: Ain Evard
1993: Ain Evard
1994: Ain Evard
1995: Ramon Kaju
1996: Ramon Kaju
1997: Marko Turban
1998: Ramon Kaju
1999: Ramon Kaju
2000: Marko Aleksejev
2001: Ramon Kaju
2002: Marko Aleksejev
2003: Marko Aleksejev
2004: Marko Aleksejev
2005: Marko Aleksejev
2006: Marko Aleksejev
2007: Marko Aleksejev
2008: Karl Lumi
2009: Karl Lumi
2010: Karl Lumi
2011: Karl Lumi
2012: Karl Lumi
2013: Karl Lumi
2014: Hendrik Lepik
2015: Karl Lumi
2016: Karl Lumi
2017: Karl Lumi
2018: Karl Lumi
2019: Karl Lumi
2020: Kristjan Tafenau
2021: Hendrik Lillemets
2022: Hendrik Lillemets

Pole vault
1991: Valeri Bukrejev
1992: Valeri Bukrejev
1993: Valeri Bukrejev
1994: Erki Nool
1995: Marco Kirm
1996: Erki Nool
1997: Erki Nool
1998: Lennart Oja
1999: Lennart Oja
2000: Aivo Normak
2001: Eigo Siimu
2002: Kristo Kallavus
2003: Erki Nool
2004: Erki Nool
2005: Gert Rahnel
2006: Eigo Siimu

Long jump
1991: Sergei Tanaga
1992: Urmas Treiel
1993: Urmas Treiel
1994: Sergei Tanaga
1995: Priit Soosaar
1996: Ramon Kaju
1997: Indrek Kaseorg
1998: Priit Soosaar
1999: Priit Soosaar
2000: Mikk Joorits
2001: Risko Nuuma
2002: Ilja Tumorin
2003: Ilja Tumorin
2004: Igor Brjuhhov
2005: Jaanus Uudmäe
2006: Jaanus Uudmäe

Triple jump
1991: Marek Vellend
1992: Hannes Männik
1993: Sergei Tanaga
1994: Sergei Tanaga
1995: Sergei Tanaga
1996: Hannes Männik
1997: Sergei Tanaga
1998: Ilja Tumorin
1999: Hannes Männik
2000: Ilja Tumorin
2001: Ilja Tumorin
2002: Lauri Leis
2003: Lauri Leis
2004: Jaanus Suvi
2005: Jaanus Uudmäe
2006: Lauri Leis

Shot put
1991: Ants Kiisa
1992: Ants Kiisa
1993: Margus Tammaru
1994: Ants Kiisa
1995: Ants Kiisa
1996: Ants Kiisa
1997: Margus Tammaru
1998: Aleksander Tammert
1999: Margus Tammaru
2000: Margus Tammaru
2001: Margus Tammaru
2002: Aleksander Tammert
2003: Taavi Peetre
2004: Taavi Peetre
2005: Taavi Peetre
2006: Taavi Peetre

Discus throw

1917*: Aleksander Klumberg
1918*: Aleksander Klumberg
1919*: Harald Tammer
1920: Harald Tammer
1921: Harald Tammer
1922: Aleksander Klumberg
1923: Aleksander Klumberg
1924: Gustav Kalkun
1925: Gustav Kalkun
1926: Aleksander Klumberg
1927: Mihkal Liinat
1928: Gustav Kalkun
1929: Nikolai Feldmann
1930: Nikolai Feldmann
1931: Nikolai Feldmann
1932: Nikolai Feldmann
1933: Arnold Viiding
1934: Arnold Viiding
1935: Arnold Viiding
1936: Oskar Erikson
1937: Oskar Erikson
1938: Oskar Erikson
1939: Paul Määrits
1940: Oskar Linnaste
1941: –
1942: Oskar Linnaste
1943: Aleksander Kreek
1944: Elmar Lilienthal
1945: Aadu Tarmak
1946: Aadu Tarmak
1947: Arvo Putmaker
1948: Heino Lipp
1949: Heino Lipp
1950: Dimitri Prants
1951: Heino Lipp
1952: Heino Lipp
1953: Heino Lipp
1954: Heino Lipp
1955: Heino Apart
1956: Heino Heinaste
1957: Heino Apart
1958: Kaupo Metsur
1959: Kaupo Metsur
1960: Kaupo Metsur
1961: Enn Erikson
1962: Kaupo Metsur
1963: Kaupo Metsur
1964: Kaupo Metsur
1965: Kaupo Metsur
1966: Kaupo Metsur
1967: Kaupo Metsur
1968: Kaupo Metsur
1969: Enn Erikson
1970: Veljo Kuusemäe
1971: Enn Erikson
1972: Enn Erikson
1973: Enn Erikson
1974: Veljo Kuusemäe
1975: Enn Erikson
1976: Veljo Kuusemäe
1977: Veljo Kuusemäe
1978: Veljo Kuusemäe
1979: Kalev Külv
1980: Kalev Külv
1981: Kalev Külv
1982: Kalev Külv
1983: Kalev Külv
1984: Kalev Külv
1985: Kalev Külv
1986: Kalev Külv
1987: Kalev Külv
1988: Kalev Külv
1989: Kalev Külv
1990: Ants Kiisa
1991: Valter Külvet
1992: Ants Kiisa
1993: Aleksander Tammert
1994: Aleksander Tammert
1995: Aleksander Tammert
1996: Ants Kiisa
1997: Aleksander Tammert
1998: Aleksander Tammert
1999: Aleksander Tammert
2000: Aleksander Tammert
2001: Aleksander Tammert
2002: Aleksander Tammert
2003: Aleksander Tammert
2004: Gerd Kanter
2005: Gerd Kanter
2006: Gerd Kanter
2007: Gerd Kanter
2008: Gerd Kanter
2009: Gerd Kanter
2010: Aleksander Tammert
2011: Gerd Kanter
2012: Gerd Kanter
2013: Gerd Kanter
2014: Gerd Kanter
2015: Gerd Kanter
2016: Martin Kupper
2017: Martin Kupper
2018: Gerd Kanter
2019: Gerd Kanter
2020: Martin Kupper
2021: Martin Kupper
2022: Kevin Sakson

Hammer throw
1991: Jüri Tamm
1992: Matti Raudsepp
1993: Jüri Tamm
1994: Jüri Tamm
1995: Matti Raudsepp
1996: Matti Raudsepp
1997: Matti Raudsepp
1998: Matti Raudsepp
1999: Matti Raudsepp
2000: Matti Raudsepp
2001: Martti Merila
2002: Martti Merila
2003: Märt Israel
2004: Märt Israel
2005: Marek Vähi
2006: Martti Merila

Javelin throw

1917*: Aleksander Klumberg
1918*: Aleksander Klumberg
1919*: Aleksander Klumberg
1920: Aleksander Klumberg
1921: Aleksander Klumberg
1922: Aleksander Klumberg
1923: Aleksander Klumberg
1924: Aleksander Klumberg
1925: Johann Meimer
1926: Johann Meimer
1927: Aleksander Klumberg
1928: Johannes Schütz
1929: Gustav Sule
1930: Gustav Sule
1931: Gustav Sule
1932: Gustav Sule
1933: Gustav Sule
1934: Gustav Sule
1935: Gustav Sule
1936: Artur Mägi
1937: Gustav Sule
1938: Gustav Sule
1939: Artur Mägi
1940: Friedrich Issak
1941: –
1942: Paul Vares
1943: Endel Nääb
1944: Johannes Püss
1945: Harry Vallmann
1946: Friedrich Issak
1947: Friedrich Issak
1948: Ants Maiste
1949: Harry Vallmann
1950: Roland Ilves
1951: Ants Maiste
1952: Harry Vallmann
1953: John Põldsam
1954: Heino Tiik
1955: John Põldsam
1956: Charles Vallmann
1957: Charles Vallmann
1958: Mart Paama
1959: Charles Vallmann
1960: Charles Vallmann
1961: Mart Paama
1962: Charles Vallmann
1963: Mart Paama
1964: Charles Vallmann
1965: Mart Paama
1966: Toomas Savi
1967: Vambola Poljakov
1968: Mart Paama
1969: Mart Paama
1970: Mart Paama
1971: Mart Paama
1972: Mart Paama
1973: Mart Paama
1974: Ain Veenpere
1975: Heino Puuste
1976: Ain Veenpere
1977: Agu Rukki
1978: Kalju Mägi
1979: Heino Puuste
1980: Toivo Moorast
1981: Heino Puuste
1982: Toivo Moorast
1983: Toivo Moorast
1984: Ülo Rukki
1985: Marek Kaleta
1986: Olavi Malts
1987: Sulev Lepik
1988: Marek Kaleta
1989: Marek Kaleta
1990: Toivo Moorast
1991: Sulev Lepik
1992: Marek Kaleta
1993: Donald Sild
1994: Donald Sild
1995: Marek Kaleta
1996: Margus Kübar
1997: Donald Sild
1998: Heiko Väät
1999: Andrus Värnik
2000: Andrus Värnik
2001: Heiko Väät
2002: Rainer Raudsepp
2003: Andrus Värnik
2004: Andrus Värnik
2005: Andrus Värnik
2006: Andrus Värnik
2007: Risto Mätas
2008: Mihkel Kukk
2009: Tanel Laanmäe
2010: Ahti Peder
2011: Mihkel Kukk
2012: Risto Mätas
2013: Risto Mätas
2014: Tanel Laanmäe
2015: Magnus Kirt
2016: Tanel Laanmäe
2017: Magnus Kirt
2018: Magnus Kirt
2019: Magnus Kirt
2020: Ranno Koorep
2021: Ergo Tamm
2022: Magnus Kirt

Decathlon

1920: Aleksander Klumberg
1921: –
1922: Eugen Neumann
1923: Heinrich Paal
1924: Aleksander Klumberg
1925: Elmar Rähn
1926: Richard Ivask
1927: Mihkel Liinat
1928: Evald Kink
1929: Johann Meimer
1930: Johann Meimer
1931: Edgar Tamm
1932: Arnold Niggol
1933: Arnold Niggol
1934: Elmar Lilienthal
1935: Elmar Lilienthal
1936: Elmar Rähn
1937: Elmar Lilienthal
1938: Heino Koik
1939: Toivo Õunap
1940: Heino Koik
1941: –
1942: Paul Toomla
1943: Johannes Rander
1944: Heino Lipp
1945: Paul Toomla
1946: Heino Lipp
1947: Heino Lipp
1948: Karl Lont
1949: Heino Lipp
1950: Heino Lipp
1951: Viktor Hellerma
1952: Heino Tiik
1953: Pavel Šenitsev
1954: Heino Tiik
1955: Uno Palu
1956: Uno Palu
1957: Aleksander Transtok
1958: Uno Palu
1959: Heinrich Kriivan
1960: Uno Palu
1961: Rein Aun
1962: Heino Tiik
1963: Uno Palu
1964: Uno Palu
1965: Priit Paalo
1966: Priit Paalo
1967: Priit Paalo
1968: Rein Tõru
1969: Kaidu Meitern
1970: Heino Sildoja
1971: Jaan Lember
1972: Kaidu Meitern
1973: Peeter Põld
1974: Peeter Põld
1975: Peep Tõnisson
1976: Toomas Suurväli
1977: Tõnu Kaukis
1978: Toomas Suurväli
1979: Margus Kasearu
1980: Tõnu Kaukis
1981: Valter Külvet
1982: Sven Reintak
1983: Urmas Käen
1984: Sven Reintak
1985: Sven Reintak
1986: Tiit Pahker
1987: Tiit Pahker
1988: Aivar Haller
1989: Ain Arro
1990: Erki Nool
1991: Indrek Kaseorg
1992: Erki Nool
1993: Indrek Kaseorg
1994: Valter Külvet
1995: Valter Külvet
1996: Raido Mägi
1997: Raido Mägi
1998: Sven Simuste
1999: Aivo Normak
2000: Aivo Normak
2001: Indrek Kaseorg
2002: Villu Sepp
2003: Indrek Kaseorg
2004: Päärn Brauer
2005: Andres Raja
2006: Andres Raja
2007: Aigar Kukk
2008: Mikk Pahapill
2009: Indrek Turi
2010: Andres Raja
2011: Tarmo Riitmuru
2012: Hendrik Lepik
2013: Andres Raja
2014: Kaarel Jõeväli
2015: Taavi Tšernjavski
2016: Kristjan Rosenberg
2017: Taavi Tšernjavski
2018: Taavi Tšernjavski
2019: Janek Õiglane
2020: Risto Lillemets
2021: Kristjan Rosenberg
2022: Maicel Uibo

20,000 metres walk
1991: Vladimir Kostjutšenkov
1992: Vladimir Kostjutšenkov
1993: Mart Järviste
1994: Mart Järviste
1995: Mart Järviste
1996: Mart Järviste
1997: Toivo Tanning
1998: Lauri Lelumees
1999: Lauri Lelumees
2000: Margus Luik
2001: Margus Luik
2002: Margus Luik
2003: Margus Luik
2004: Sergei Kutsenko
2005: Margus Luik
2006: Lauri Lelumees

50 kilometres walk
1997: Toivo Tanning
1998: Ants Palmar
1999: Lauri Lelumees
2000: Lauri Lelumees
2001: Lauri Lelumees
2002: Lauri Lelumees
2003: Margus Luik
2004: Margus Luik
2005: Margus Luik

Women

100 metres

1927: Sara Teitelbaum
1928: Sara Teitelbaum
1929: Sara Teitelbaum
1930: Sara Teitelbaum
1931: Sara Teitelbaum
1932: Taimo Kelder
1933: Gertrud Labrik
1934: Taimo Kelder
1935: Ilse Uus
1936: Henriette Israel
1937: Ilse Uus
1938: Ilse Uus
1939: Ilse Uus
1940: Ilse Uus
1941: -
1942: Karin Aviste
1943: Laine Hein
1944: Laine Hein
1945: Eugenia Laasik
1946: Eugenia Laasik
1947: Eugenia Laasik
1948: Eugenia Laasik
1949: Helve Karilaid
1950: Juta Sandbank
1951: Juta Sandbank
1952: Liivia Pütsepp
1953: Salme Tornius
1954: Liivia Pütsepp
1955: Salme Tornius
1956: Liivia Pütsepp
1957: Salme Tornius
1958: Liivia Härsing
1959: Liivia Härsing
1960: Liivia Härsing
1961: Liivia Härsing
1962: Liivia Härsing
1963: Liivia Härsing
1964: Tamara Palm
1965: Helgi Mägi
1966: Helgi Mägi
1967: Helle Volmer
1968: Hilju Lillo
1969: Helgi Mägi
1970: Marion Piisang
1971: Tiina Torop
1972: Galina Pavlova
1973: Tiina Torop
1974: Galina Schneider
1975: Irina Stehhina
1976: Taisi Pihela
1977: Sirje Põldma
1978: Merike Õunpuu
1979: Aili Alliksoo
1980: Saima Tiik
1981: Taimi Loov
1982: Saima Tiik
1983: Tatjana Petruškevitš
1984: Helle Kruuse
1985: Irina Vassiljeva
1986: Taimi Kõnn
1987: Irina Vassiljeva
1988: Riina Suhotskaja
1989: Riina Suhotskaja
1990: Riina Suhotskaja
1991: Anu Kaljurand
1992: Anu Kaljurand
1993: Rutti Luksepp
1994: Milena Alver
1995: Milena Alver
1996: Kertu Tiitso
1997: Rutti Luksepp
1998: Rutti Luksepp
1999: Rutti Luksepp
2000: Marianna Voronina
2001: Katrin Käärt
2002: Katrin Käärt
2003: Kadri Viigipuu
2004: Katrin Käärt
2005: Katrin Käärt
2006: Ksenija Balta
2007: Ksenija Balta
2008: Ksenija Balta
2009: Anita Maksimova
2010: Grit Šadeiko
2011: Grit Šadeiko
2012: Maarja Kalev
2013: Ksenija Balta
2014: Maarja Kalev
2015: Maarja Kalev
2016: Ksenija Balta
2017: Maarja Kalev
2018: Õilme Võro
2019: Õilme Võro
2020: Ksenija Balta
2021: Karoli Käärt
2022: Ann Marii Kivikas

200 metres
1991: Tatjana Iljina
1992: Rutti Luksepp
1993: Killu Ratas
1994: Milena Alver
1995: Milena Alver
1996: Rutti Luksepp
1997: Rutti Luksepp
1998: Rutti Luksepp
1999: Katrin Käärt
2000: Rutti Luksepp
2001: Katrin Käärt
2002: Egle Uljas
2003: Rutti Luksepp
2004: Ebe Reier
2005: Kadri Viigipuu
2006: Maris Mägi

400 metres
1991: Natalja Popova
1992: Anna Burunova
1993: Killu Ratas
1994: Tiia Eeskivi
1995: Rutti Luksepp
1996: Rutti Luksepp
1997: Killu Ratas
1998: Maria Sahharova
1999: Maria Sahharova
2000: Maria Sahharova
2001: Julia Krasnova
2002: Rutti Luksepp
2003: Jekaterina Duman
2004: Maria Sahharova
2005: Jekaterina Duman
2006: Maris Mägi

800 metres
1991: Natalja Pihelgasi
1992: Katrin Rehemaa
1993: Agneta Land
1994: Agneta Land
1995: Agneta Land
1996: Maile Mangusson
1997: Maile Mangusson
1998: Maile Mangusson
1999: Maile Mangusson
2000: Maile Mangusson
2001: Maile Mangusson
2002: Vaiki Aunin
2003: Maile Mangusson
2004: Maria Sahharova
2005: Maria Sahharova
2006: Maria Sahharova

1500 metres
1991: Ille Kukk
1992: Sirje Eichelmann
1993: Sirje Eichelmann
1994: Jane Salumäe
1995: Agneta Land
1996: Natalja Buljukina
1997: Natalja Buljukina
1998: Maile Mangusson
1999: Maile Mangusson
2000: Maile Mangusson
2001: Maile Mangusson
2002: Kadri Kelve
2003: Maile Mangusson
2004: Maile Mangusson
2005: Jekaterina Patjuk
2006: Jekaterina Patjuk

3000 metres
1991: Ille Kukk
1992: Sirje Eichelmann
1993: Sirje Eichelmann
1994: Jane Salumäe
1995: Ille Kukk
1996: Ille Kukk
1997: Natalja Buljukina
1998: Külli Kaljus

5000 metres

1999: Liilia Kesküla
2000: Külli Kaljus
2001: Kadri Kelve
2002: Kadri Kelve
2003: Kadri Kelve
2004: Kadri Kelve
2005: Jekaterina Patjuk
2006: Jekaterina Patjuk
2007: Jekaterina Patjuk
2008: Jekaterina Patjuk
2009: Jekaterina Patjuk
2010: Jekaterina Patjuk
2011: Annika Rihma
2012: Jekaterina Patjuk
2013: Jekaterina Patjuk
2014: Jekaterina Patjuk
2015: Jekaterina Patjuk
2016: Egle-Helene Ervin
2017: Jekaterina Patjuk
2018: Lily Luik

Half marathon
1993: Sirje Eichelmann
1994: Sirje Eichelmann
1995: Madli Tuuling
1996: Madli Tuuling
1997: Külli Kaljus
1998: Madli Tuuling
1999: Külli Kaljus
2000: Külli Kaljus
2001: Külli Kaljus
2002: Liilia Kesküla
2003: Külli Kaljus
2004: Kadri Kelve
2005: Tiina Tross

Marathon
1991: Galina Bernat
1992: Sirje Eichelmann
1993: Siiri Kangur
1994: Galina Bernat
1995: Kaja Mulla
1996: Tiina Idavain
1997: Galina Bernat
1998: Kaja Mulla
1999: Sirje Velba
2000: Kaja Mulla
2001: Sirje Velba
2002: Sirje Velba
2003: Ülle Kummer-Leman
2004: Sigrid Valdre
2005: Tiina Tross

3000 metres steeplechase
2003: Anastasia Gerassimova
2004: Olga Andrejeva
2005: Olga Andrejeva
2006: Katrin Kuusk

100 metres hurdles
1991: Anu Kaljurand
1992: Anu Kaljurand
1993: Virge Naeris
1994: Kertu Tiitso
1995: Kertu Tiitso
1996: Tiia Eeskivi
1997: Marge Salujõe
1998: Kertu Tiitso
1999: Triin Maller
2000: Jaanika Meriküll
2001: Mirjam Liimask
2002: Mirjam Liimask
2003: Mirjam Liimask
2004: Mirjam Liimask
2005: Kadri Viigipuu
2006: Mirjam Liimask

400 metres hurdles
1991: Tiia Eeskivi
1992: Reili Liiva
1993: Ingrid Maiste
1994: Tiia Eeskivi
1995: Tiia Eeskivi
1996: Tiia Eeskivi
1997: Evelin Talts
1998: Kristi Kiirats
1999: Tiia Eeskivi
2000: Milena Alver
2001: Julia Krasnova
2002: Julia Krasnova
2003: Julia Krasnova
2004: Julia Krasnova
2005: Vera Duman
2006: Kristi Kiirats

High jump

1923: Rosine Peek
1924: Olga Rebane
1925: Lydia Tippo
1926: Antonia Kroon
1927: Ludmilla Einstein
1928: Magda Tomasson
1929: Gertrud Schiefner
1930: Lydia Raudsepp
1931: Lydia Raudsepp
1932: Olga Arras
1933: Olga Arras
1934: Lydia Raudsepp
1935: Lydia Erikson
1936: Olga Arras
1937: Olga Arras
1938: Olga Arras
1939: Leida Hiiepuu
1940: Olga Arras
1941: -
1942: Olga Usar
1943: Olga Usar
1944: Aino Unt
1945: Leida Hiiepuu
1946: Olga Usar
1947: Olga Usar
1948: Olga Usar
1949: Juta Raudsepp
1950: Aino Huimerind
1951: Juta Raudsepp
1952: Juta Raudsepp
1953: Taimi Kroon
1954: Maila Kurss
1955: Helvi Keller
1956: Helgi Haljasmaa
1957: Õie Munk
1958: Helgi Kivi
1959: Linda Kivi
1960: Valentina Pavlovitš
1961: Eha Sepp
1962: Valentina Pavlovitš
1963: Valentina Pavlovitš
1964: Valentina Pavlovitš
1965: Valentina Pavlovitš
1966: Ene Rampe
1967: Õie Munk
1968: Muza Vorotõntseva
1969: Ester Aavik
1970: Muza Lepik
1971: Reet Kaarneem
1972: Reet Kaarneem
1973: Malle Sang
1974: Malle Sang
1975: Reet Arrak
1976: Reet Arrak
1977: Marina Surovtseva
1978: Ljubov Stognei
1979: Reet Lindal
1980: Merle Kibus
1981: Lea Laks
1982: Siiri Schmidt
1983: Maiu Siraki
1984: Merle Kibus
1985: Maiu Siraki
1986: Ingrid Pulst
1987: Merike Suurkivi
1988: Virge Naeris
1989: Ly Niinelaid
1990: Ly Niinelaid
1991: Marika Raiski
1992: Virge Naeris
1993: Liina Põldots
1994: Virge Naeris
1995: Liina Põldots
1996: Liina Põldots
1997: Kärt Siilats
1998: Kärt Siilats
1999: Tiina Mägi
2000: Kärt Siilats
2001: Tiina Mägi
2002: Kärt Siilats
2003: Kärt Siilats
2004: Kärt Siilats
2005: Anna Iljuštšenko
2006: Anna Iljuštšenko
2007: Anna Iljuštšenko
2008: Anna Iljuštšenko
2009: Anna Iljuštšenko
2010: Anna Iljuštšenko
2011: Anna Iljuštšenko
2012: Eleriin Haas
2013: Anna Iljuštšenko
2014: Eleriin Haas
2015: Eleriin Haas
2016: Anna Iljuštšenko
2017: Grete Udras
2018: Eleriin Haas
2019: Grete Udras
2020: Lilian Turban
2021: Lilian Turban
2022: Karmen Bruus

Pole vault

1997: Margit Randver
1998: Merle Kivimets
1999: Margit Randver
2000: Merle Kivimets
2001: Margit Randver
2002: Margit Randver
2003: Kristin Karu
2004: Lea Saapar
2005: Kristina Ulitina
2006: Kristina Ulitina
2007: Lembi Vaher
2008: Lembi Vaher
2009: Lembi Vaher
2010: Lembi Vaher
2011: Reena Koll
2012: Lembi Vaher
2013: Lembi Vaher
2014: Reena Koll
2015: Reena Koll
2016: Getter Marie Lemberg
2017: Lembi Vaher
2018: Reena Koll
2019: Marleen Mülla
2020: Marleen Mülla
2021: Marleen Mülla
2022: Marleen Mülla

Long jump
1991: Renna Tõniste
1992: Virge Naeris
1993: Virge Naeris
1994: Virge Naeris
1995: Kristel Berendsen
1996: Renna Tõniste
1997: Anu Anderson
1998: Virge Naeris
1999: Riina Vals
2000: Riina Vals
2001: Diana Nikitina
2002: Larissa Netšeporuk
2003: Larissa Netšeporuk
2004: Kristel Berendsen
2005: Kristel Berendsen
2006: Veera Baranova

Triple jump
1991: Carina Kjellman
1992: Marika Raiski
1993: Virge Naeris
1994: Renna Tõniste
1995: Renna Tõniste
1996: Renna Tõniste
1997: Kristel Berendsen
1998: Virge Naeris
1999: Virge Naeris
2000: Diana Nikitina
2001: Diana Nikitina
2002: Sirkka-Liisa Kivine
2003: Sirkka-Liisa Kivine
2004: Veera Baranova
2005: Veera Baranova
2006: Veera Baranova

Shot put
1991: Eha Rünne
1992: Eha Rünne
1993: Eha Rünne
1994: Eha Rünne
1995: Eha Rünne
1996: Eha Rünne
1997: Eha Rünne
1998: Eha Rünne
1999: Eha Rünne
2000: Eha Rünne
2001: Eha Rünne
2002: Eha Rünne
2003: Eha Rünne
2004: Eha Rünne
2005: Eha Rünne
2006: Eha Rünne

Discus throw
1991: Elju Kubi
1992: Eha Rünne
1993: Eha Rünne
1994: Eha Rünne
1995: Eha Rünne
1996: Eha Rünne
1997: Eha Rünne
1998: Eha Rünne
1999: Eha Rünne
2000: Eha Rünne
2001: Eha Rünne
2002: Eha Rünne
2003: Eha Rünne
2004: Eha Rünne
2005: Eha Rünne
2006: Eha Rünne

Hammer throw
1997: Tiiu Küll
1998: Kadri-Liis Vähi
1999: Terje Matsik
2000: Kadri-Liis Vähi
2001: Terje Matsik
2002: Terje Matsik
2003: Maris Rõngelep
2004: Maris Rõngelep
2005: Maris Rõngelep
2006: Maris Rõngelep

Javelin throw
1991: Katrin Kirm
1992: Ruth Põldots
1993: Maret Kalviste
1994: Maret Kalviste
1995: Moonika Aava
1996: Moonika Aava
1997: Ruth Põldots
1998: Ruth Väät
1999: Ruth Väät
2000: Moonika Aava
2001: Moonika Aava
2002: Moonika Aava
2003: Jana Trakmann
2004: Moonika Aava
2005: Moonika Aava
2006: Jana Trakmann

Heptathlon
1991: Piret Rasina
1992: Virge Naeris
1993: Virge Naeris
1994: Virge Treiel
1995: Rutti Luksepp
1996: Rutti Luksepp
1997: Marge Salujõe
1998: Virge Naeris
1999: Rutti Luksepp
2000: Rutti Luksepp
2001: Moonika Kallas
2002: Rutti Luksepp
2003: Rutti Luksepp
2004: Gudrun Kaukver
2005: Ksenija Balta

5000 metres walk
1991: Maia Jõemaa
1992: Anna-Maria Malanova
1993: Anneli Aru
1994: Natalja Ivanova
1995: Natalja Ivanova
1996: Natalja Ivanova
1997: Natalja Ivanova
1998: Natalja Ivanova
1999: Anneli Aru

10,000 metres walk
1991: Kerli Kesküla
1992–1996: Not held
1997: Anneli Aru
1998: Anneli Aru
1999: Anneli Aru
2000: Kaity-Marin Tiitmaa
2001: Jekaterina Jutkina
2002: Jekaterina Jutkina
2003: Jekaterina Jutkina
2004: Svetlana Gribkova
2005: Jekaterina Jutkina
2006: Jekaterina Jutkina

20 kilometres walk
2000: Kaity-Marin Tiitmaa
2001: Kerly Lillemets
2002: Jekaterina Jutkina
2003: Kerly Lillemets
2004: Maarja Rand
2005: Ragle Raudsepp

References

EESTI MEISTRIVÕISTLUSTE KOLM PAREMAT (Estonian Championships top3 1917–2018) Estonian Athletic Association. Retrieved 2022-06-29
Estonian Championships – Champions 1991–2006. GBR Athletics. Retrieved 2021-04-17.

Winners
 
Estonian Championships
Athletics